Jack Starr was an outsider musician who recorded in 1960s Texas and whose recordings have been released by Norton Records. A comprehensive compilation of his work has recently been repressed as the "Born Petrified" LP. Starr recorded the song "Pain (Gimme Sympathy)," which was later covered by the two-piece band The Upholsterers (consisting of Jack White and Brian Muldoon), who released their only single, Makers of High Grade Suites, in 2000.

References

External links
 

Living people
Norton Records artists
Year of birth missing (living people)